Kentucky Route 329 is a state highway located  northeast of downtown Louisville, Kentucky. The western terminus of the route is at U.S. Route 42 in Prospect. The eastern terminus is at KY 146 in Crestwood. An undivided, four lane bypass route of KY 329 exists in the vicinity of Crestwood.

Route description
KY 329 begins at an intersection with US 42 in Prospect, Jefferson County, heading east on two-lane undivided Boy Scout Road. The road passes through wooded residential neighborhoods, crossing into Oldham County. The route becomes Covered Bridge Road and heads through a mix of farmland and woodland with some housing developments. KY 329 comes to an intersection with KY 1694 and forms a brief concurrency with that route before it splits to the north. A short distance later, KY 329 intersects the western terminus of KY 1817, at which point it heads southeast as an unnamed road. The route heads through more rural areas and curves south as it comes to an interchange with I-71. Past this interchange, the briefly becomes four lanes before making a turn south, with KY 329 Bypass heading straight. KY 329 heads into Crestwood as a two-lane road and passes residential developments. The route heads into business areas and forms a brief concurrency with KY 22. Past this, KY 329 winds south on Lagrange Road and crosses a CSX railroad line before ending at KY 146.

Major intersections

KY 329 Bypass

The bypass heads east as four-lane undivided Veterans Memorial Parkway, passing through fields. The road curves to the south and runs between residential neighborhoods to the west and commercial areas and South Oldham High School to the east. KY 329 Bypass turns east and intersects KY 146 in a commercial area before becoming a five-lane road with a center left-turn lane and passing under a CSX railroad line. The eastern terminus is at KY 22 in Crestwood.

Major intersections

See also
Roads in Louisville, Kentucky

References

0329
0329
Transportation in Oldham County, Kentucky
Transportation in Jefferson County, Kentucky